Gavin Ronald Oliver (born 6 September 1962) is an English former professional footballer who made more than 350 Football League appearances playing as a central defender.

Career
Oliver played for Sheffield Wednesday, Tranmere Rovers, Brighton & Hove Albion and Bradford City.

He began his career as a centre forward but switched to playing as a central defender following an injury to a player in that position in a youth match. He joined Sheffield Wednesday's groundstaff in July 1979, and turned professional in August 1980. After loan spells at Tranmere Rovers and Brighton & Hove Albion he signed for Bradford City for £20,000 in November 1985.

After retiring as a player, in November 2007 he was working as Sunderland's recruitment officer.

References

1962 births
Living people
Footballers from Tyne and Wear
English footballers
Association football defenders
Sheffield Wednesday F.C. players
Tranmere Rovers F.C. players
Brighton & Hove Albion F.C. players
Bradford City A.F.C. players
English Football League players
Sunderland A.F.C. non-playing staff